HCSO may refer to: 

Harris County, Texas Sheriff's Office
Hernando County, Florida Sheriff's Office
Hennepin County Sheriff's Office
Hillsborough County, Florida Sheriff's Office
The Hungarian Central Statistical Office